The 2008 Taiwanese legislative election was held on 12 January 2008 for members of the Legislative Yuan. It was the first Legislative Yuan election after the constitutional amendments of 2005, which extended term length from three to four years, reduced seat count from 225 to 113, and introduced the current electoral system.

The results gave the Kuomintang (KMT) and the Pan-Blue Coalition a supermajority (86 of the 113 seats) in the legislature, handing a heavy defeat to then-President Chen Shui-bian's Democratic Progressive Party, which won the remaining 27 seats only. The junior partner in the Pan-Green Coalition, the Taiwan Solidarity Union, won no seats.

Two transitional justice referendums, both of which failed to pass due to low turnout, were held at the same time.

Legislature reform 
For the first time in the history of Taiwan, most members of the Legislative Yuan were to be elected from single-member districts: 73 of the 113 members were chosen in such districts by the plurality voting system (first-past-the-post). Parallel to the single member constituencies (not compensating for disproportionality in single-member districts), 34 seats were elected in one national district by party-list proportional representation. For these seats, only political parties whose votes exceed a five percent threshold were eligible for the allocation. Six further seats were reserved for Taiwanese aborigines. Therefore, each elector had two ballots under parallel voting.

The aboriginal members were elected by single non-transferable vote in two 3-member constituencies for lowland aborigines and highland aborigines respectively. This did not fulfill the promise in the treaty-like document A New Partnership Between the Indigenous Peoples and the Government of Taiwan, where each of the 13 recognized indigenous peoples was to get at least one seat, and the distinction between highland and lowland abolished.

The breakdown by administrative unit was:

The delimitation of the single-member constituencies within the cities and counties was a major political issue, with bargaining between the government and the legislature. Of the 15 cities and counties to be partitioned (the ten others have only one seat), only seven of the districting schemes proposed by the CEC were approved in a normal way. The eight other schemes were decided by drawing lots: "Taipei and Taichung cities and Miaoli and Changhua counties will adopt the version suggested by the CEC, while Kaohsiung city will follow the consensus of the legislature. Taipei county will follow the proposal offered by the opposition Taiwan Solidarity Union, Taoyuan county will adopt the ruling Democratic Progressive Party's scheme, and Pingtung county will use the scheme agreed upon by the Non-partisan Solidarity Union, People First Party, Kuomintang and Taiwan Solidarity Union."

Impact of the electoral system 
The elections were the first held under a new electoral system which had been approved by both major parties in constitutional amendments adopted in 2005, but which one political scientist has argued favored the KMT. The rules are set up so that every county has at least one seat, which gave a higher representation for smaller counties in which the KMT traditionally has done well. Northern counties tend to be marginally in favor of KMT, whereas southern counties tend to be strongly for DPP, and the single member system limits this advantage. The partially led to the result that the legislative count was highly in favor of the KMT while the difference in the number of votes cast for the KMT and DPP were less dramatic.

It was considered possible that the 2008 Taiwanese presidential election would be held on the same day as this election, but this was eventually not the case, with the presidential happening 10 weeks later, in March. Two referendums were held on the same date.

Results

Legislators elected through constituency and aborigine ballots

 Notes:
 Candidates marked  are People First Party candidates running under the KMT party banner.
 Candidates marked are New Party candidates who joined the Kuomintang with New Party endorsement.
 Most names on the list follow the Tongyong Pinyin romanization used in the Central Election Committee website and may not accurately reflect the candidates' preferred romanization of their name.

Legislators elected through proportional representation and overseas Chinese ballots

 Notes:
 Candidates marked with a ^ are overseas Chinese candidates.
 Elected candidates are marked with a  next to their name.
  candidate Wang Fang Ping is endorsed by the coalition Raging Citizens Act Now! (人民火大行動聯盟)。
 Most names on the list follow the Tongyong Pinyin romanization used in the Central Election Committee website and may not accurately reflect the candidates' preferred romanization of their name.

Legislators elected through subsequent by-elections

Impact
With this election the KMT and the Pan-Blue Coalition have more than the two-thirds majority needed to propose a recall election of the President and if NPSU votes are counted with the pan-Blue coalition, more than the three-quarters majority needed to propose constitutional amendments.

Reaction from People's Republic of China
The government of People's Republic of China, which claims sovereignty over Taiwan, remained largely silent on the election result. State media carried brief updates of results and passed no comment on either the referendum or the Kuomintang victory.

The government of China appointed 13 representatives for Taiwan to its own National People's Congress on the same day. These delegates are mostly descendants of Taiwanese who emigrated to the Mainland, or Communist supporters who fled Taiwan. Their positions are ceremonial as the PRC do not exercise effective jurisdiction over Taiwan.

See also
Seventh Legislative Yuan

Notes

References

External links

 Results of the legislative election from the Central Election Commission
 BBC News (2008-01-12): Kuomintang in huge win
 BBC News (2008-01-11): Battle lines drawn in Taiwan vote
 The World Next Week by Oxford Analytica (2008-01-10): Taiwan: year of the thaw?

Legislative elections in Taiwan
Legislative
Taiwan